The 1993 United States Senate special election  in Texas was held on June 6, 1993, to replace Democratic U.S. Senator Lloyd Bentsen, who had resigned to become Secretary of the Treasury. Governor Ann Richards appointed Democrat Bob Krueger, a Texas Railroad Commissioner, to fill the seat. Krueger ran in the special election, but was defeated in a landslide by Republican Kay Bailey Hutchison. Hutchison was the first Republican to win this seat since Reconstruction. In 2010, Krueger's campaign was named by the Houston Chronicle as the worst in Texas' modern political history.

Background
The nonpartisan blanket primary was held on May 1, 1993. Since no candidate received a majority in the primary, a runoff was held on June 6, 1993.

Candidates

Democratic
 Bob Krueger, Incumbent U.S. Senator and former U.S. Congressman
 Richard W. Fisher, businessman
 José Angel Gutierrez
 Gene Kelly
 C. "Sonny" Payne

Republican
 Kay Bailey Hutchison, Texas State Treasurer and former State Representative
 Joe Barton, U.S. Congressman
 Jack Fields, U.S. Congressman
 Charles Ben Howell
 Chuck Sibley
 Thomas D. Spink
 Herbert John Spiro
 James Vallaster
 Clymer Wright

Libertarian
 Rick Draheim

People's
 Billy Brown

Socialist Workers
 Rose "Jackie" Floyd

Independents
 Louis C. Davis
 Lou Bolling Hancock
 Roger Henson
 Don Richardson
 Maco Stewart
 Lou Zaeske

Primary election

Results

General election

Results

See also
 1992 United States Senate elections

References

Texas
1993
Texas 1993
United States Senate
United States Senate 1993
Texas 1993